Yeongtong Station is a subway station of the Bundang Line, the commuter subway line of Korail, the national railway of South Korea.

The station was opened in December 2012, as part of the latest southward extension of the Bundang Line. It is close to the Suwon Immigration office. Near exit #2 of Yeongtong Station, there is a large Homeplus. Nearby is the Suwon Immigration office.

Seoul Metropolitan Subway stations
Railway stations opened in 2012
Metro stations in Suwon